Always & Forever is a 1991 Swiss drama film directed by Samir. It was entered into the 17th Moscow International Film Festival.

Cast
 Roeland Wiesnekker as Alex
 Werner Gerber as Assistant
 Yves Raeber as Zivilfahnder
 Oliver Broumis as Claude
 Stefan Stutzer as Dani
 Heidi Züger as Babs
 Nicole Ansari-Cox as Dodo (as Nicole Ansari)
 Christoph Künzler as Kommissar Weber

References

External links
 

1991 films
1991 drama films
Swiss drama films
1990s German-language films